Ba is a given name shared by several notable people. Considered here is the 'Ba' given name prevalent in Myanmar of the 20th Century, as well as the ancient Chinese given names 跋, 霸, and 巴 (traditional Chinese in each case) which are both translated as the English 'Ba'.

Given name instances
Representative (not comprehensive) biographical instances are included below.
Born after 100
 China: Liu Ba ← 劉巴 (186–222)
 China: Zang Ba ← 臧霸 (flourished c.200)
 China: Xiahou Ba ← 夏侯霸 (flourished 220-240; died c.258)

Born after 300
 China: Feng Ba ← 馮跋 (died 430)

Born after 1800
 Myanmar: U Ba U (1887–1963)

Born after 1900
 Myanmar: U Ba Swe (1915–1987)
 Myanmar: U Ba Htay (1906–2000)

Pseudonyms
 China: Ba Jin (born 'Li Yaotang' 1904–2005)
 Vietnam: Ba Cụt (born 'Le Quang Vinh', died 1956)

Fictional characters
 Hong Kong manhua: Hung Ba ← 雄霸 (debut 1989)